The Darlaston Loop was a railway which connected the towns of Walsall, Darlaston and Wednesbury in the West Midlands of England. It was so named because it passed through the town of Darlaston.

Opening
The line was opened in 1863 to bypass the recently constructed railway through Walsall. It operated as a single track until a second track was added in 1872, and the only station on the line was located in Darlaston town centre.

Closure
It closed in 1887 but the line remained open to goods trains for another 80 years or so, when it finally closed during the 1960s.

The site today

A public footpath has been created along some of the trackbed, including the section which passed through Darlaston Station although the section to Wednesbury Town is now built on by both industrial and housing. A disused railway building stood on Crescent Road nearly 50 years after falling into disuse.

References

Closed railway lines in the West Midlands (region)
Rail transport in Walsall
Rail transport in Sandwell
Railway lines opened in 1863